Butigeidis (Budikid) was the Grand Duke of Lithuania from 1285 to 1290/1291, assuming power after the death of Daumantas. He is the first known and undisputed member of the Gediminids.

He started his rule when the Livonian Order and the Teutonic Knights were finalizing their conquest of the Baltic tribes. In 1289, leading about 8,000 troops, Butigeidis attacked Sambia. In 1289 the Teutonic Knights built a castle in Tilsit and their raids intensified. Lithuanians were forced to abandon Kolainių Castle located on the other bank of the Neman River. Butigeidis was the first to build strong castles along the Neman River. The castle system was further developed after his death and helped to resist the raids until the second half of the 14th century.

Butigeidis transferred Vaŭkavysk to Galicia-Volhynia in exchange for peace. He died in 1290 or 1292, and his brother Butvydas (also known as Pukuveras) inherited the crown.

See also 
 House of Gediminas – family tree of Butigeidis

References

Medieval Lithuanian nobility
Grand Dukes of Lithuania
Gediminids
1290s deaths
Year of birth unknown
Year of death unknown

Lithuanian monarchy